Cyclic nucleotide-gated cation channel alpha-3 is a protein that in humans is encoded by the CNGA3 gene.

Function 

This gene encodes a member of the cyclic nucleotide-gated cation channel protein family, which is required for normal vision and olfactory signal transduction. CNGA3 is expressed in cone photoreceptors and is necessary for color vision. Missense mutations in this gene are associated with rod monochromacy and segregate in an autosomal recessive pattern. Two alternatively-spliced transcripts encoding different isoforms have been described.

Clinical relevance 

Variants in this gene have been shown to cause achromatopsia and colour blindness.

See also 
 Cyclic nucleotide-gated ion channel

References

Further reading

External links 
  GeneReviews/NIH/NCBI/UW entry on Achromatopsia
  OMIM entries on Achromatopsia
 

Ion channels